Amadou Lamine-Guèye (20 September 1891 in Médine, French Sudan – 10 June 1968 in Dakar) was a Senegalese politician who became leader of the Parti Sénégalais de l'Action Socialiste ("Senegalese Party of Socialist Action"). In 1945 he and his associate, Léopold Sédar Senghor, were elected to represent Senegal in the French National Assembly. Gueye was also elected to the French Senate in 1958. 

He gave his name to the 1946  (Loi Lamine Guèye) which granted French citizenship to all inhabitants of France's overseas colonies.

Early life
Amadou Lamine-Guèye was born in Médine, French Sudan (now part of Mali), on 20 September 1891. He was educated in France, where he graduated as a lawyer in 1921. He was the first African with a doctorate in French law.

Political career

Upon his return to Africa, Guèye founded a political party and became mayor of Saint-Louis, Senegal, in 1924.

He became leader of the French Socialist Party in Senegal in 1937, and was elected as one of two Senegalese representatives to the National Assembly alongside Léopold Senghor in 1944. He was elected once again the following year, and also became mayor of Dakar. This was enacted on May 7, 1946.

Lamine-Gueye was an advocate for Senegalse assimilation with France. He was antifascist and pro-women's rights.

Guèye lost his seat in the Assembly in 1951 elections after Senghor left to form his own party. Guèye reconciled with Senghor, and was once again elected in 1958. A year later, he was elected as the first President of the independent National Assembly of Senegal.

Death
He died in Dakar on 10 June 1968. At the time, he was the President of the National Assembly.

Family and private life
He was the grandfather of Senegalese alpine skier Lamine Guèye.

See also
 List of mayors of Dakar
 Timeline of Dakar

References

External links
 
Biography on the French Senate website

1891 births
1968 deaths
People from Kayes Region
People of French West Africa
French Section of the Workers' International politicians
Senegalese Party of Socialist Action politicians
Members of the Constituent Assembly of France (1945)
Members of the Constituent Assembly of France (1946)
Deputies of the 1st National Assembly of the French Fourth Republic
French Senators of the Fourth Republic
Senators of French West Africa
Presidents of the National Assembly (Senegal)
Mayors of Dakar